Gymnastics events have been staged at the Olympic Games since 1896. Bulgarian female gymnasts have participated in every Summer Olympics since 1952, except for 2000 and 2016. A total of 50 female gymnasts have represented Bulgaria. Bulgarian women have won one medal at the Olympics – the 1988 floor exercise bronze, which was won by Diana Dudeva.

Gymnasts

Medalists

References

Bulgaria
gymnasts
Olympic